Bailey is a ghost town in Grady County, Oklahoma, United States. It was 12 miles northeast of Marlow and had a post office from June 25, 1892, until September 30, 1932. It was named after J. J. Bailey, a wagon master on a stage line to Fort Sill.

References

Ghost towns in Oklahoma
Populated places in Grady County, Oklahoma